The Woodbine School District is a community public school district that serves students in pre-kindergarten through eighth grade from Woodbine, in Cape May County, New Jersey, United States.

As of the 2018–19 school year, the district, comprised of one school, had an enrollment of 239 students and 23.6 classroom teachers (on an FTE basis), for a student–teacher ratio of 10.1:1.

The district is classified by the New Jersey Department of Education as being in District Factor Group "A", the lowest of eight groupings. District Factor Groups organize districts statewide to allow comparison by common socioeconomic characteristics of the local districts. From lowest socioeconomic status to highest, the categories are A, B, CD, DE, FG, GH, I and J.

Public school students in ninth through twelfth grades attend Middle Township High School as part of a sending/receiving relationship that began with the 2013-14 school year; students from Avalon, Dennis Township and Stone Harbor also attend the school. As of the 2018–19 school year, the high school had an enrollment of 767 students and 64.6 classroom teachers (on an FTE basis), for a student–teacher ratio of 11.9:1.

History
Students had previously been sent to attend high school in Millville, as part of a relationship with the Millville Public Schools. Students attended
Memorial High School for ninth grade and half of tenth and 
Millville Senior High School for 10th grade through the 12th grade with those in attendance as of the 2013-14 school year completing until their education in Millville until graduation; the Woodbine district estimated savings of $4,000 per student by the switch from Millville to Middle Township, with total savings of $200,000 annually after all of Woodbine's high school students are attending Middle Township.

In 2008 the Woodbine District was considering switching its receiving high school from Millville to Middle Township. In 2013 the Woodbine chose to change its receiving high school district to Middle Township. Lynda Anderson-Towns, superintendent of the Woodbine district, cited the closer proximity and smaller size of Middle Township High. The first group of Woodbine 9th graders to Middle Township High began attending in fall 2013. The Woodbine students already attending Millville high schools remained there.

School
Woodbine Elementary School serves students in grades PreK-8. The school had an enrollment of 232 students in the 2018–19 school year.
Anthony DeVico, Principal

Administration
Core members of the district's administration are:
Anthony DeVico, Superintendent
Darren Harris and Henry Bermann, Business Administrator / Board Secretary

Board of education
The district's board of education, comprised of nine members, sets policy and oversees the fiscal and educational operation of the district through its administration. As a Type II school district, the board's trustees are elected directly by voters to serve three-year terms of office on a staggered basis, with three seats up for election each year held (since 2012) as part of the November general election. The board appoints a superintendent to oversee the day-to-day operation of the district.

Demographics
In 2008 the district had about 215 students in its K-8 school, and it sent 60 students to Millville high schools. It employed 20 teachers for its K-8 students.

References

External links
Woodbine School District

School Data for the Woodbine School District, National Center for Education Statistics

Woodbine, New Jersey
New Jersey District Factor Group A
School districts in Cape May County, New Jersey
Public K–8 schools in New Jersey
Schools in Cape May County, New Jersey